Jennifer Elizabeth Brady (born April 12, 1995) is an inactive American professional tennis player. She reached a career-high singles WTA ranking of world No. 13 on 22 February 2021, and a career-high doubles ranking of 44 on 19 August 2019. Brady has won one WTA Tour singles title and one doubles title as well as four singles and five doubles titles on the ITF Circuit. 

Brady first rose to prominence following her surprise run to the fourth round of the 2017 Australian Open as a qualifier, registering victories over Heather Watson and 14th seed Elena Vesnina. She also reached the fourth round of that year's US Open, defeating Barbora Strýcová and Monica Niculescu before falling to then-world No. 1, Karolína Plíšková. Following struggles with injuries and an increased focus on doubles, including a semifinal showing at the 2019 Australian Open, Brady returned to prominence in singles in 2020, where she defeated Maria Sharapova, and recorded her first No. 1 victory by defeating Ashleigh Barty at Brisbane, and defeated Elina Svitolina, Markéta Vondroušová, and Garbiñe Muguruza at Dubai. She won her first WTA singles title at the Top Seed Open in Lexington, Kentucky, where she defeated Jil Teichmann in straight sets. She progressed to her first Grand Slam semifinal at the 2020 US Open, defeating former world No. 1, Angelique Kerber, en route. Following her impressive US hardcourt swing, she reached a then career-high singles ranking of No. 24 on November 16th. At the first Grand Slam of the following year, Brady reached her first major final at the 2021 Australian Open, where she lost to Naomi Osaka.

Brady had previously attended the University of California, Los Angeles (UCLA) and made her debut for the Bruins tennis team in 2013. During her freshman year at UCLA, she helped her team win the 2014 Division 1 Women's Tennis National Championship in Athens, Georgia. She completed her sophomore year of college before turning professional in 2014.

Professional career

2014–2016: Early years
Brady made her Grand Slam debut at the 2014 US Open, having received a wildcard with Samantha Crawford for the women's doubles main-draw. Brady won four singles and fives doubles titles on the ITF Women's Circuit. She first played in the main draw of a WTA 125K series tournament at the Carlsbad Classic in November 2015, reaching the semifinals. In September 2016 on the WTA Tour, she reached the quarterfinals at the Guangzhou International Open, in singles and doubles.

2017: Breakthrough at Grand Slam tournaments
Brady reached the singles main draw of a Grand Slam tournament for the first time at the Australian Open, after winning all three of her qualifying matches. In the main draw, she defeated Maryna Zanevska, Heather Watson, and 14th seed Elena Vesnina. Her run came to an end in the fourth round with a straight set loss to Mirjana Lučić-Baroni.

Due to her success at the Australian Open, Brady was able to obtain a spot in the main draw of the remaining three Grand Slam tournaments without playing the qualifying rounds. At the French Open, she lost her opening-round match to the 13th seed Kristina Mladenovic. At Wimbledon, Brady lost in the second round to the eighth seed Dominika Cibulková, in straight sets. At the US Open, she defeated Andrea Petkovic in the first, the 23rd seed Barbora Strýcová in the second, and Monica Niculescu in the third round. Facing top-seeded Karolína Plíšková in the fourth round, Brady was beaten in straight sets.

2018: Singles slump, doubles success

Brady found more success in doubles than singles. In January, she reached the quarterfinals in doubles of the Australian Open with Vania King. In March, she reached the final of the WTA 125 Indian Wells Challenger with Vania King, where they fell to Taylor Townsend and Yanina Wickmayer in two sets.

2019: Return to form
Brady began to come back into form. She began the year by reaching the semifinals in doubles of the Australian Open with Alison Riske, before falling to the world No. 2 team of Tímea Babos and Kristina Mladenovic. In February, she made it to the third round of the Dubai Championships where she defeated world No. 22, Jeļena Ostapenko, and No. 20, Caroline Garcia, before falling to No. 4, Petra Kvitová, in three sets. The following week, she reached the final of the WTA 125 Indian Wells Challenger, in which she fell to Viktorija Golubic, in three sets. To keep the hot streak going, the following week at the Indian Wells Open, she defeated world No. 19, Caroline Garcia, before falling to No. 12, Ashleigh Barty, in the third round.

Brady's next notable result of the year came during the grass-court swing at the Nottingham Open, when she reached semifinals before falling to eventual champion Caroline Garcia, in three sets. She also had a strong showing at the Premier Mandatory China Open, where she defeated fellow Americans Amanda Anisimova and Madison Keys before falling to US Open champion Bianca Andreescu in the third round.

2020: Top 50 debut, first WTA title, US Open semifinal, top 25 year-end ranking
Brady began the season at the Brisbane International, where she made it through qualifying and went on to defeat Maria Sharapova, before stunning world No. 1 and home favorite, Ash Barty, in the round of 16. It was the biggest win of her career to date, and helped her reach a new career-high singles ranking of No. 49 in the world. She went on to lose to No. 4, Petra Kvitová, in the quarterfinals in straight sets. 

Brady got a tough draw at the Australian Open, where she fell to No. 4, Simona Halep, in the first round. She did push the former world No. 1 though, as Halep had to save three set points in the first set. In doubles, she reached the quarterfinals for the third consecutive year, but she and Caroline Dolehide fell to top seeded Hsieh Su-wei and Barbora Strýcová, in straight sets.

Brady made it through qualifying at the Dubai Tennis Championships and then secured her second win over a top-10 opponent of her career when she defeated No. 6, Elina Svitolina in the first round. In the second round, she faced Markéta Vondroušová, where she rallied from a set and a double break down to win the match in three sets. In the quarterfinals, she faced two time major champion and former world No. 1, Garbiñe Muguruza, defeating her in a three-setter to move on to her first Premier semifinal, where she lost in two sets to eventual champion Simona Halep.

Brady participated in the all-star Credit One Bank Invitational in Daniel Island, and exhibition event that served as the Charleston tournament after organizers reformatted the tournament after the COVID-19 pandemic as a Laver Cup style event. She was drafted by Bethanie Mattek-Sands to Team Peace, which won 26–22, going 4–0 with nine points (one win in the second day for one point, one win in the fourth day for two points, one win in the fifth day for three points, and one win in the sixth day for three points). She was the only undefeated player for the entire exhibition tournament.

Brady's first tournament following the resumption of the WTA Tour was the Lexington Open in Kentucky, where she won her maiden WTA tournament singles title. She defeated Heather Watson, sixth seed Magda Linette, Marie Bouzková, Coco Gauff, and Jil Teichmann without dropping a set, or facing a tiebreak in any set. Following her victory, Brady's ranking rose to a career-high No. 40.

At the US Open Brady was seeded 28th despite being ranked 41st in the world (due to the number of top-20 players who pulled out of the tournament.) She defeated Anna Blinkova, CiCi Bellis and Caroline Garcia in straight sets, before defeating 2016 champion and former world No. 1, Angelique Kerber, to advance to her first Grand Slam quarterfinal. She then recorded another straight-sets win over the 23rd seed Yulia Putintseva to reach her first Grand Slam semifinal, where she lost to Naomi Osaka in three sets.

2021: Australian Open final, top 15 and Olympics debut
Brady started the season in Abu Dhabi. After winning the first set, she lost in the first round to Tamara Zidanšek. She also played doubles in the same tournament with Garbiñe Muguruza, they lost in the quarterfinals.

At the Australian Open, Brady beat Aliona Bolsova, Madison Brengle, Kaja Juvan, Donna Vekić, Jessica Pegula, and Karolína Muchová to reach her first Grand Slam final where she was defeated by Naomi Osaka, in straight sets. As a result of this run, she reached a career-high of world No. 13 in the singles rankings on 22 February 2021.

At her debut at the 2021 Olympics, Brady was the eleventh and only American seed in the tournament. In the first round, Brady was defeated by Italian Camila Giorgi, in straight sets.

Playing style
Brady is an aggressive player who possesses an all-court game. She is a strong server, with her first serve being recorded as high as 114 mph (184 km/h), allowing her to serve multiple aces per match. She also possesses an effective kick serve, that iring free points. Her greatest weapon is her forehand, which is hit with heavy topspin, pushing her opponents far beyond the baseline, allowing her to accumulate a high number of winners with this shot. She also possesses an effective two-handed backhand, with which she can hit winners from any position on the court. Due to her doubles experience, she is an effective volleyer, possessing a complete repertoire of shots to perform at the net, and will frequently choose to approach the net to finish points. Due to her fitness, she possesses an effective defensive game, and is a strong player on return.

World TeamTennis
Brady has played one season with World TeamTennis starting in 2019, when she made her debut with the Washington Kastles. It was announced that she would be joining the Orange County Breakers during the 2020 WTT season (canceled due to the pandemic).

Endorsements
Brady is endorsed by Asics for clothing and shoes, and by Babolat for racquets. She uses the Babolat Pure Aero racquet on court.

Career statistics

Grand Slam tournament performance timelines

Current through the 2021 French Open.

Singles

Doubles

Grand Slam tournament finals

Singles: 1 (runner-up)

References

External links
 
 
 
 UCLA Bruins profile

1995 births
Living people
American female tennis players
UCLA Bruins women's tennis players
Tennis people from Pennsylvania
Tennis people from Florida
Sportspeople from Harrisburg, Pennsylvania
Olympic tennis players of the United States
Tennis players at the 2020 Summer Olympics